The Diocese of Paphos (Latin: Dioecesis Paphensis) was a Roman Catholic diocese in the city of Paphos, on the island of Cyprus. It was erected in 1196 and suppressed in 1570 after the Ottoman conquest of Cyprus in 1570.

Ordinaries
Jaime de Portugal (18 Jun 1457 – 27 Aug 1459 Died)
Guillaume Gonème, O.S.A. (13 May 1471 – Sep 1473 Died)
Giacomo de Cadapesario (3 Jul 1495 – )
Jacopo Pisauro (? – 1541)
Giovanni Maria Pisauro (Coadjutor Bishop: 14 Nov 1541 to 1557)
Pietro Contareno (9 Aug 1557 – 1562 Resigned)
Francesco Contarini (bishop) (Contareno) (16 Dec 1562 – 1570 Died)

See also
Catholic Church in Cyprus

References

Former Roman Catholic dioceses
Catholic Church in Cyprus
Paphos
Kingdom of Cyprus